Xia, Shang, Zhou Dynasties: From Myths to Historical Facts is a book by a Taiwanese history professor Olga Gorodetskaya. It touches upon several predominant theories regarding Ancient China's earliest dynasties, namely Xia dynasty, Shang dynasty and Zhou dynasty, and tries to present archaeological evidence that those theories are in fact myths originated in early Chinese historical works, which resemble hagiographies and have little basis in reality on the ground. The book and as a result its author are a subject of considerable controversy within the Sinological academia, especially so within the People's Republic of China.

References

 
History books about China
2013 non-fiction books